The Second Ministry of Narendra Modi is the Council of Ministers headed by Prime Minister of India Narendra Modi that was formed after the 2019 general election which was held in seven phases in 2019. The results of the election were announced on 23 May 2019 and this led to the formation of the 17th Lok Sabha. The swearing-in ceremony was arranged in the courtyards of Rashtrapati Bhavan at Raisina Hill. The heads of the states of BIMSTEC countries were invited as guests of honor for this ceremony.

On 7 July 2021, the government went through a ministry expansion with several big names dropped and new faces sworn in. Many current ministers were also given promotion for their good work.

Council of Ministers

Cabinet Ministers 

|colspan=7|

Ministers of State (Independent Charge)

Ministers of State

Demographics of the Council of Ministers

The following tables represent the demographics of the Ministers as of 6 July 2022.

NDA Cabinet by Party

NDA Cabinet by State

References

External links 

Website of Cabinet Secretariat of India
Council of Ministers – Official Portal of the Indian Government

 
India
Modi administration
Cabinets established in 2019
Indian union ministries
2019 establishments in India
Narendra Modi ministry
Modi
Bharatiya Janata Party
Shiv Sena
Shiromani Akali Dal
Lok Janshakti Party
Apna Dal (Sonelal)
Republican Party of India (Athawale)

Janata Dal (United)